Dragoslav (Cyrillic: Драгослав) is a South Slavic masculine given name, derived from drag ("dear, beloved") and slava ("glory, fame"), both very common in Slavic dithematic names.

Notable people with the name include:

Dragoslav Avramović
Dragoslav Bokan
Dragoslav Čakić
Dragoslav Jevrić
Dragoslav Mitrinović
Dragoslav Srejović
Dragoslav Stepanović
Dragoslav Šekularac
Jovan Dragoslav (fl. 1300–15), Serbian nobleman

See also
I. Dragoslav
Drago (disambiguation)
Dragoljub
Dragomir
Slavic names

References

Croatian masculine given names
Bulgarian masculine given names
Serbian masculine given names
Slovene masculine given names

Ukrainian masculine given names